Neblina is a heavy metal band from Angola, founded in 2001.

They released an album in 2006, Innocence Falls in Decay. In the same year, they played a number of shows in Germany, for the 2006 FIFA World Cup. In 2007, they performed at Windhoek Metal Fest in Namibia, and were reported to be working on a second album.

Line up
 Mauro Neb - vocals
 Michel 'Fio' Figueiredo - lead guitar
 Beto - rhythm guitar
 Bokolo - bass
 Thiago - drums

Discography 
Innocence Falls in Decay (2006)

References

External links 
 Neblina's Blog
 Angola Press article in Portuguese

Angolan musical groups
Gothic metal musical groups
2001 establishments in Angola